Ernesto Toledo (born 4 March 1996) is an Argentine professional footballer who plays as a left-back for Deportivo Español.

Career
Toledo made the breakthrough into senior football with Deportivo Español during the 2016–17 Primera B Metropolitana, making his senior debut on 11 March 2017 during an away loss to Defensores de Belgrano; he appeared eighteen more times that season, as they were eliminated from the promotion play-offs by Deportivo Riestra. He also received a red card in 2016–17, as he also did in the succeeding 2017–18 campaign as he featured in twenty-nine Primera B Metropolitana fixtures.

Career statistics
.

References

External links

1996 births
Living people
Place of birth missing (living people)
Argentine footballers
Association football defenders
Primera B Metropolitana players
Deportivo Español footballers